Jaime Villanueva (1765–1824) was a Spanish historian and writer.

Writers from the Valencian Community
1765 births
1824 deaths